Bari is a city and a municipality in Dholpur district in the state of Rajasthan, India. Bari came into existence as a Pargana of [princely state] of Dholpur during the rule of Rana Ram Singh of Dholpur (born 1883, died 1911). He was the Jat ruler of the princely state Dholpur (1901–1911) in Rajasthan, India. He was from Bamraulia gotra of Jats. He was born on 26 May 1883 and succeeded Rana Nihal Singh in 1901 after his death. He was not of age when ascended to the throne. He got full rights in March 1905.

He married the daughter of the Maharaja Nabha. He was educated at Mayo College, Ajmer; later joined the Imperial Cadet Corps.
During his rule the state was divided into six parganas namely, 1. Dholpur, 2. Rajakheda, 3. Badi, 4. Basaidi, 5. Mania and 6. Kulari. This way the administration of the state was improved. He died on 2 April 1911. His successor was Rana Udaybhanu Singh.

Bari subdivision is well known for its excellent sandstone. Historically, this red stone was used for local construction like Bari fort, Talab-E-Shahi, Jublee hall Dholpur, Dholpur palace, Nihal tower (cloak tower) Dholpur and most of other local structures. The world-famous national monuments which are in list of  UNESCO world heritage site in India are also made up of Dholpur red stone which is extracted from Bari area in capital Delhi, like the Delhi  Red Fort, Humayun Tomb (Humayun ka Maqbara) located in Nizamuddin, East Delhi.

Bari red stone was used in rebuilding of Agra Fort by Akbar. This red sandstone was extracted from Barauli, a village in Bari subdivision.

The modern and future monument The Swaminarayan Akshardham (Delhi) Temple in New Delhi, is constructed entirely from Rajasthani pink sandstone. "On 17 December 2007, Michael Whitty, an official world record adjudicator for Guinness World Records, awarded the reward Akshardham as the World's Largest Comprehensive Hindu Temple."

The architect of modern Delhi, Edwin Lutyens, a major 20th century British architect who is known for imaginatively adapting traditional architectural style, had a special liking for this stone, and the Rashtrapati Bhavan exemplifies the use of Dholpur stone in monumental architecture.

Geography
Bari is located at Latitude:  26°38'58.77"N and Longitude :  77°37'2.58"E
Tourist attractions

Talab-E-Shahi and Khanpur Mahal

Talab-E-Shahi is situated five kilometers from Bari town, on the bank of a lake. The Khanpur Mahal is situated near Talab-E-Shahi. It was a pavilion palace built for Shahjahan but never occupied. At present this building is headquarters of Bari area RAC (police).

Dholpur was known for its natural environment, dense forests and ample games that attracted the royal princes regularly visiting this region during Mughal period. According to "Humayunnama" Babar once took all his wives and consorts to Dholpur on the death of his son Anwar Mirza for a change. Not only that, the beauty of Dholpur fascinated Akbar so much that he constructed the palaces at Khanpur on the banks of Talab-E-Shahi near Bari.

Ram Sagar and Van Vihar  Wildlife Sanctuary
Spread about 60 sq km area, Van Vihar sanctuary is divided into two parts Van Vihar and Ramsagar. There are two separate wildlife sanctuaries. Van Vihar is situated on Vindhyan plateau and is inhabited by animals like Sambar (deer), Chital, blue bull, wild bear hyena and leopard. The sanctuary is surrounded by Dhok and Khair trees.

The Dholpur-Bari Train

The Dholpur-Bari Light Railway (DBLR) was a 2' 6" narrow gauge line (among 23 notable narrow gauge railways).
Previously owned and managed by the Dholpur Durbar.

Bhuteswar temple
This is a famous and Holy temple of lord Shiva, on the bank of Parvati river, 10 km from Bari, on the Bari-Baseri road. This is very old temple of Bari Baseri Area, thousands of people visit this temple every month, there are regular picnic and feast (bhoj) programmes organized regularly, on the opposite riverbank stands the Panchmukhi Hanuman temple, this temple is near the river.

Sant Nagar
Shri Param Hans Advait Mat Sant Nagar is a Hindu temple.
Advait Mat was a cluster of movements in northern India that perceive themselves to be originating from Totapuri in the 18th century Shri Paramhans Advait Math made its advent over a hundred years ago to spread and preach truth, ideals of Bhakti, Karam Yoga, and spiritual knowledge.

This is a very peaceful and disciplined temple where all saints (Sadhu, Mahatma) produce their food vegetable and milk by self-management (Karmayoga), in temple land which is surrounded by large boundary wall, they are independent by economy. There is very nice garden and temple inside the boundary, the temple is opened for visit from 8Am to 5Pm on regular interval for general public,This temple Provides social services by a charitable hospital free of cost to poor citizens.

Damoh(Dhamoye)
This is a waterfall in Sarmathura region, Placed a distance of 35 kilometer from Bari. It is the attractive tourist destination in whole district. It is visible in rainy season [July–September]. Besides this, Damoh (Dhamoye) has a long and green forest range with wild animals. Tiger Mohan from Ranthambore National Park, whenever escapes from Ranthambhor likes the forest territory of Dhamoh and van vihar in Dholpur.

Demographics
The Bari Municipality has population of 62,721 of which 33,673 are males while 29,048 are females as per report released by Census India 2011. Literacy rate of Bari city is 70.75% higher than state average of 66.11%. In Bari, Male literacy is around 79.38% while female literacy rate is 60.79%. Population of Children with age of 0-6 is 10102 which is 16.11% of total population of Bari (M). In Bari Municipality, Female Sex Ratio is of 863 against state average of 928. Moreover, Child Sex Ratio in Bari is around 847 compared to Rajasthan state average of 888. there is only one girls school for senior education. Out of total population, 18,730 were engaged in work or business activity. Of this 16,057 were males while 2,673 were females. In census survey, worker is defined as person who does business, job, service, and cultivator and labour activity. Of total 18730 working population, 88.05% were engaged in Main Work while 11.95% of total workers were engaged in Marginal Work.

References

External links
https://web.archive.org/web/20110210053922/http://www.indiaspecialist.co.in/dholpur.html

http://www.irfca.org/articles/manning/dholpur.html 

http://issuu.com/aecworldxp/docs/stone_trail

Cities and towns in Dholpur district
Tourist attractions in Dholpur district